was a Japanese football player. He played for Japan national team.

Club career
Takahashi played for Osaka SC many Japan national team players Yoshimatsu Oyama, Toshio Miyaji, Uichiro Hatta and Kiyonosuke Marutani were playing in those days.

National team career
In May 1925, Takahashi was selected Japan national team for 1925 Far Eastern Championship Games in Manila. At this competition, on May 20, he debuted against Republic of China. But Japan lost in this match (0-2).

National team statistics

References

External links
 
 Japan National Football Team Database

Year of birth missing
Year of death missing
Place of birth missing
Japanese footballers
Japan international footballers
Association football defenders